Cape Walker is an ice-covered cape which forms the southeast end of Thurston Island. It was named by the Advisory Committee on Antarctic Names after Captain Edward K. Walker, captain of the Canisteo, a tanker in the Eastern Group of U.S. Navy Operation HIGHJUMP from 1946 to 47.

Maps
 Thurston Island – Jones Mountains. 1:500000 Antarctica Sketch Map. US Geological Survey, 1967.
 Antarctic Digital Database (ADD). Scale 1:250000 topographic map of Antarctica. Scientific Committee on Antarctic Research (SCAR). Since 1993, regularly upgraded and updated.

Headlands of Ellsworth Land
Thurston Island